Masura Parvin (born 2001) is a Bangladeshi women's football player who plays as a centre-back for Bashundhara Kings Women and the Bangladesh women's national football team. She previously played for the Bangladesh women's national under-16 football team. She played four matches at 2017 AFC U-16 Women's Championship qualification in Group C held in Dhaka, Bangladesh.

Early years
Masura was born on 17 October 2001 in Satkhira district.

Playing career

International
Masura was selected to the Bangladesh girls' U-17 team for the 2017 AFC U-16 Women's Championship qualification – Group C matches. She made her debut at the tournament during a match against Iran on 27 August 2016. After winning the group, Bangladesh qualified for the 2017 AFC U-16 Women's Championship in Thailand in September 2017.

International goals
Scores and result list Bangladesh's goal tally first.

Honours

Club 
Bashundhara Kings Women

 Bangladesh Women's Football League
 Winners (2): 2019–20, 2020–21

International 
SAFF Women's Championship
Runner-up : 2016
South Asian Games
Bronze : 2016
SAFF U-18 Women's Championship
Champion (1): 2018
Bangamata U-19 Women's International Gold Cup
Champion trophy shared (1): 2019

References

External links

2001 births
Living people
Bangladeshi women's footballers
Bangladesh women's international footballers
Bashundhara Kings players
Bangladesh Women's Football League players
Women's association football defenders
People from Satkhira District
Bangladeshi women's futsal players
South Asian Games bronze medalists for Bangladesh
South Asian Games medalists in football